William Butts Macomber Jr. (March 28, 1921 – November 19, 2003) was an American diplomat who served in several positions in the United States Department of State. He was the 12th president of the Metropolitan Museum of Art.

Early life and education 
Macomber was born in Rochester, New York, on March 28, 1921. He attended Phillips Academy, graduating in 1940, and Yale University, graduating in 1943.

During World War II, he served in the United States Marine Corps, assigned to the Office of Strategic Services. After the war, he returned to Yale, receiving a master's degree in 1947. He next attended Harvard Law School, receiving his law degree in 1949. He then worked at Boston University as a lecturer in government, then moved on to the University of Chicago, receiving a second master's degree in 1951.

Career 
Macomber worked in the U.S. Government for decades, serving under five presidents. His positions were unstable, however, because he was always a political appointee and not a career Foreign Service officer.

Macomber joined the Central Intelligence Agency in 1951. Two years later, he moved to the United States Department of State as a special assistant of intelligence. In 1957, President Dwight D. Eisenhower nominated Macomber as assistant secretary of state for legislative affairs and served until February 27, 1961.

President John F. Kennedy then named Macomber as United States ambassador to Jordan and Macomber held this post from April 5, 1961, until December 25, 1963. In 1964, he became assistant administrator of the United States Agency for International Development.

Macomber returned to the office of assistant secretary of state for legislative affairs after he was named to the office by President Lyndon B. Johnson, and Macomber served in this office from March 7, 1967, through October 2, 1969.

Richard Nixon appointed Macomber deputy under secretary of state for management on September 26, 1969, and he served in this role from October 3, 1969, to April 4, 1973.

President Richard Nixon appointed him United States ambassador to Turkey on March 27, 1973. He presented his credentials on May 16, 1973, and served until he left his post on June 15, 1977. In 1975, he published a book, The Angels' Game: A Handbook of Modern Diplomacy. He retired from the United States Foreign Service in 1977.

Post-government life 

In 1978, Macomber became the first full-time president of the Metropolitan Museum of Art. As president, he oversaw implementation of the MMA's master plan developed under his predecessor C. Douglas Dillon. He retired in 1986 due to the Met's mandatory retirement age of 65. In 1983, he was among the founders of the American Academy of Diplomacy.

In retirement, Macomber taught social studies and coached football at Nantucket High School.

Personal life
They lived in a Fifth Avenue apartment and had a summer home in Nantucket, Massachusetts.

Macomber died of complications related to Parkinson's disease at his home in Nantucket, on November 19, 2003.

References

External links
 September 30, 1989 Interview with William B. Macomber Jr. at the Library of Congress.
Oral history interview with William B. Macomber , 1994 June 28-Dec. 15 from The Metropolitan Museum of Art Archives, New York.

1921 births
2003 deaths
United States Assistant Secretaries of State
People from Rochester, New York
Yale University alumni
Harvard Law School alumni
University of Chicago alumni
Boston University faculty
Ambassadors of the United States to Jordan
Ambassadors of the United States to Turkey
United States Marine Corps personnel of World War II
Presidents of the Metropolitan Museum of Art
People of the Office of Strategic Services
20th-century American diplomats